The Cactus Revisited is a remix extended play by American Queens-based hip hop trio 3rd Bass. It was released on September 7, 1990 via Def Jam Recordings. Out of a total seven tracks, the album consists of six remixed songs from The Cactus Album and one unreleased song. The remixing was provided by 3rd Bass themselves, Dave Dorrell, Marley Marl, Prince Paul, CJ Mackintosh, and Sam Sever of Downtown Science. It received both lackluster commercial and critical reception and is considered to be a patchy diversion, according to Dean Carlson of AllMusic.

Track listing

References

External links

1990 EPs
Remix EPs
3rd Bass albums
1990 remix albums
Def Jam Recordings EPs
Def Jam Recordings remix albums
Albums produced by Dante Ross
Albums produced by Prince Paul (producer)
Albums produced by John Gamble (record producer)